Garin, or in Spanish-speaking countries Garín, is a surname. Notable people with the surname include:

André Garin (1822–1895), American Roman Catholic priest
Erast Garin (1902–1980), Russian actor
Eugene Garin (1922–1994), Ukrainian painter and artist
Geoff Garin (born 1953), American political consultant
Hermes Garín (born 1947), Uruguayan Roman Catholic bishop
Hernán Garín (born 1983), Argentine footballer
Janette Garin, Filipino politician
Manuela Garín (1914–2019), Spanish-born Mexican mathematician
Marie-Charlotte Garin (born 1995), French politician
Maurice Garin (1871–1957), French cyclist, winner of the first Tour de France 1903
Nikolai Garin-Mikhailovsky (1852–1906), Russian writer
Oleg Garin (various people)
Vladimir Garin (1987–2003), Russian actor
Cristian Garín (born 1996), Chilean tennis player

Fictional characters
Pyotr Petrovich Garin or Engineer Garin, the main character in Aleksey Tolstoy's novel The Garin Death Ray (also in the films The Hyperboloid of Engineer Garin and Failure of Engineer Garin)
Seth Garin, character in Richard Bachman's novel The Regulators
William Garin, character in The Great Wall played by Matt Damon